Ayo-Maria Atoyebi (born 3 December 1944) is a Nigerian Bishop Emeritus of the Roman Catholic Church. He was born in Okerimi-oro, Kwara state, Nigeria and was ordained a priest of Orders of Friars Preachers on 17 December 1978. He served as Bishop of Ilorin Diocese from 6 March 1992 to 11 June 2019.

Priesthood and Episcopal appointment 
Ayo-Maria Atoyebi was born on 3 December 1944. He was ordained a priest of the Roman Catholic Church under the Order of Friars Preacher on 17 December 1978.

On 6 March 1992, he was appointed the bishop of the Catholic Diocese of Ilorin after which he was consecrated as Bishop on 17 May 1992 by Bishop Peter Yariyok Jatau. His ordination was also carried out by co-consecrators which includes: Bishop John Onaiyekan and Bishop Felix Alaba Adeosin Job. He was the bishop of Ilorin Diocese from 1992 to 2019.

Marian activities 
Bishop Atoyebi is a devotee of the Virgin Mary and promoter of Marian devotions and activities. He has written many books and given many talks on the blessed Virgin Mary. He started an annual Marian pilgrimage programme where Catholics in Ilorin Diocese visit the Blessed Virgin Mary pilgrimage site at Okerimi-Oro his hometown. He is also a member of the theological commission of the International Marian Association.

Retirement 
On 11 June 2019, Atoyebi retired as the bishop of the Roman Catholic Diocese of Ilorin due to old age and frail health and was replaced by His Coadjutor; Bishop Paul Adegboyega Olawoore.

References

External links 

1944 births
Living people
20th-century Roman Catholic bishops in Nigeria
21st-century Roman Catholic bishops in Nigeria
People from Kwara State
Roman Catholic bishops of Ilorin